Gagosh, also rendered as Gakosh, may refer to:
 Gagosh-e Olya
 Gagosh-e Sofla